Crock is an American comic strip created by Bill Rechin and Brant Parker depicting the French Foreign Legion. Distributed by King Features Syndicate, the strip began in 1975 and ended in May 2012. , it appeared in 250 newspapers in 14 countries.

Don Wilder took over the writing duties in 1976 as Parker returned his focus to The Wizard of Id. Following the death of Bill Rechin in May 2011, the strip was drawn by Kevin Rechin and written by Bob Morgan, who is Rechin's brother-in-law. Publication of new Crock strips ended with the May 20, 2012, Sunday comic, though reprints of older strips by Bill Rechin have continued to run.

Characters and story
King Features describes Crock as "the greatest and longest-running parody of the Foreign Legion classic, Beau Geste," written in 1924 by P. C. Wren and filmed several times. The comic strip is set in the middle of a barren desert at a desolate fort, where the tyrannical and corrupt Commandant Vermin P. Crock rules over a curious group of beleaguered legionnaires:

 the cowardly Captain Poulet (French for chicken),
 the simple-minded Maggot who digs and digs,
 Figowitz (who just wants a kind word),
 heavyweight camp follower Grossie (who now owns Le Cesspool, a favorite, yet dilapidated hangout for the characters, and is married to Maggot),
 the narcissistic Preppie,
 Mario the Bartender,
 Jules Schmesse who is always about to be executed,
 the Arab horde and their stone god Nebookanezzer, who resembles a moai,
 the ancient sage, never seen, who lives in a cave and dispenses wisdom and sarcasm,
 the men of Outpost 5,
 the Bookmobile,
 the men being punished in the heat boxes,
 Quench the ever-dry camel,
 the Lost Patrol who have been wandering the desert for 20 years, trying to find their way back to the fort.

TV appearance
A live action Crock sketch was included in the special Mother's Day Sunday Funnies broadcast May 8, 1983 on NBC.

Theme park
Crock is featured in the Universal Studios Florida theme park Islands of Adventure, where Crock's fort is part of Toon Extra in Toon Lagoon.

References

American comic strips
Gag-a-day comics
1975 comics debuts
2012 comics endings
French Foreign Legion in popular culture
Military comics
Parody comics
Parodies of films
Parodies of literature
Comics set in Africa